Japan's National Institute for Minamata Disease (NIMD) is a medical research facility in Minamata, Kumamoto Prefecture, that focuses on Minamata disease. It is part of Japan's Ministry of the Environment

References 

Medical research institutes in Japan